The Jewell Apartments is a historic building located in Mason City, Iowa, United States.  Completed in 1917 by local contractor Fred Lippert, this apartment building is two C-shaped buildings joined together.  

Lippert may have also designed the building.  Its Prairie School design creates a harmonious unity for this urban housing structure.  The exterior of the two-story building features brick on the lower two-thirds and stucco on the upper third.  The building was listed on the National Register of Historic Places in 1980.

References

Residential buildings completed in 1917
Apartment buildings in Mason City, Iowa
National Register of Historic Places in Mason City, Iowa
Apartment buildings on the National Register of Historic Places in Iowa
Prairie School architecture in Iowa